The YWCA-YMCA of Sweden is the Swedish branch of the YMCA and the YWCA. It was established in 1966 following a merger of the YMCA of Sweden and the YWCA of Sweden.

The YWCA-YMCA of Sweden has 40,000 members in 140 local associations. Several Swedish YWCA-YMCA associations have been successful in sport.

References

External links
  

1966 establishments in Sweden
Christianity in Sweden
Religious organizations based in Sweden
Christian organizations established in 1966
Sweden
Youth organizations based in Sweden
Sweden